The Human Rights Organization of Judea and Samaria (also Yesha Human Rights Organization was an Israeli non-governmental organization (NGO) headed by Orit Strook.

The organization was established in 1999. Its stated goals are to defend the human and civil rights of Jewish Israelis living in the West Bank, and formerly in the Gaza Strip. The organization say that these citizens - commonly referred to as settlers - are not adequately defended by other human rights organizations it identifies as left-wing, such as B'Tselem.

One aspect of its activities is to report on alleged discrimination of settlers by the Israeli Police.

References

Civil rights organizations
Human rights organizations based in Israel
Non-governmental organizations involved in the Israeli–Palestinian conflict
Israeli settlement